Gibraltar Range  is a national park in north-eastern New South Wales, Australia,  north-east of Glen Innes and  north of Sydney.  The Park is part of the Washpool and Gibraltar Range area of the World Heritage Site Gondwana Rainforests of Australia inscribed in 1986 and added to the Australian National Heritage List in 2007.

Birds
The park is part of the  Gibraltar Range Important Bird Area (IBA), identified as such by BirdLife International because it is a block of highland forest that supports one of only five remaining populations of the vulnerable rufous scrub-bird, as well as significant populations of green catbirds, Australian logrunners, paradise riflebirds and pale-yellow robins.

See also

 Protected areas of New South Wales
 Pappinbarra River
 Camden Haven River
 High Conservation Value Old Growth forest

Gallery

References

External links
 Gibraltar Range National Park at the Department of Environment and Climate Change (New South Wales)

National parks of New South Wales
Protected areas established in 1967
Gondwana Rainforests of Australia
1967 establishments in Australia
Important Bird Areas of New South Wales
New England (New South Wales)